On 21 May 2020, Louise Smith (March 23, 2004 — May 21, 2020), a 16-year-old, was found murdered in Havant, Hampshire, England. She had been missing for 13 days prior. She was staying with her cousin  Chazlynn and her uncle Shane Mays, who later murdered her.  On 8 December, Smith's cousin-in-law, Shane Mays, was convicted of her murder by a jury at Winchester Crown Court.

Trial
In the trial, the prosecution said that Mays had lured Smith to walk to the woodland, with the aim of sexually assaulting her. Smith's body was found after an extended search by specialist teams, involving 306 people, drones, and dogs. It was described as "dreadfully treated", with "repeated, heavy blows to the head", subsequently defiled with a stick and burned in an attempt to "destroy her body". The exact cause of death could not be determined due to extensive burns. A clinical review of Mays found that he had an "extremely low" IQ of 63. Mays was sentenced to a minimum prison term of 25 years.

References 

2004 births
2020 deaths
2020 murders in the United Kingdom
Formerly missing people
Murder in Hampshire
May 2020 crimes in Europe
2020s in Hampshire